Martine Syms (born 1988) is an American artist based in Los Angeles who works in publishing, video, installation, and performance. Her work focuses on identity and the portrayal of the self in relation to themes such as feminism and Black culture. This is often explored through humour and social commentary. Syms coined the term "conceptual entrepreneur" in 2007 to characterize her practice.

Early life
Martine Syms was born in Los Angeles in 1988. She was raised with three siblings in the Altadena suburb of Los Angeles. She was home-schooled by her parents from age 7 through 12, and knew from an early age that she wanted to be an artist. When discussing home-schooling, Syms comments: '“The area I grew up in didn’t have the best public schools and it was hard to get all of us into the same private school – for a lot of racist reasons from what it sounds like.”' Syms' mother was interested in art and writing, and her father was an amateur photographer. She attended a pre-college program called CSSSA (California State Summer School for the Arts) at CalArts.

In 2007 Syms received a BFA (Bachelor of Fine Arts) in Film, Video, and New Media at the School of the Art Institute of Chicago. She obtained an MFA (Master of Fine Arts) from Bard College, Annandale-on-Hudson, NY, in 2017.

Career 
From 2007–2012 Syms co-directed Golden Age, an artist-run space in Chicago. 

In 2015, Syms was included in the New Museum Triennial Surround Audience. In the same year her video Notes on Gesture was exhibited at Bridget Donahue Gallery in New York City and the Machine Project in Los Angeles. It explores the role of seemingly insignificant bodily gestures in the creation of identity.

Syms worked with Willo Perron and Associates to help write Kanye West's speech at the 2015 MTV Video Music Awards where he announced his candidacy for the 2020 Presidential Election.

Syms presented the performance Misdirected Kiss at the Storm King Art Center in New York's Hudson Valley, and at the Broad Museum in Los Angeles in 2016. The work takes its title from the 1904 film The Misdirected Kiss. At times resembling a TED talk, the work picks apart issues of language and representation. In the same year her work was also displayed in a solo exhibition at the Institute of Contemporary Arts in London titled Martine Syms: Fact & Trouble. Included in this exhibition was the Syms' video series Lessons.

In 2017, Syms showcased her work in a solo exhibition at the Museum of Modern Art in New York. The show was titled Projects 106: Martine Syms which centered around a feature-length film, Incense, Sweaters & Ice. She was also shortlisted for the Future Generation Art Prize in 2017. Syms is the recipient of the 2017 Louis Comfort Tiffany Foundation grant. Syms joined the faculty of the California Institute of the Arts in September 2018. In the same year she won the Graham Foundation Fellowship for Advanced Studies in the Fine Arts. She also received a Future Fields Commission in time-based media from the Philadelphia Museum of Art and the Fondazione Sandretto Re Rebaudengo.

Syms is the founder of Dominica Publishing, an artists' press dedicated to exploring Black identity in contemporary art and visual culture.

In 2022, Syms directed her debut feature film The African Desperate which premiered at the International Film Festival Rotterdam. Streaming service Mubi acquired the distribution rights to the film.

Conceptual Entrepreneur 
The broad idea of the artist as an agent seeking financial self-determination runs throughout modern and contemporary art, most notably in works by Marcel Duchamp and Marcel Broodthaers, but also Piero Manzoni, David Hammons, and Joe Scanlan. The idea was given its most explicit sanction in a text by Scanlan titled People in Trade, in which he outlines Conceptual Art's business potential:"In the end, and quite ironically, so-called difficult artists like [Agnes] Martin and [David] Hammons have turned out to be much better economic models than their more celebrated counterparts could ever be. Their arcane interests, unique skills and often restrained production methods epitomize such concepts as personal branding, value adding, and just-in-time production philosophies, state of the art business innovations that they and other artists have never gotten credit for. Until now. The avant garde lives! Not because its more meaningful or radical than any other activity, but because it fills a legitimate market niche."Syms' self-identified title sustains one of her main ideas: self-determination through a sustainable institution, which stems from her interest in independent music and Black-owned businesses. Her artwork has been exhibited and screened at venues including Human Resources, Bridget Donahue Gallery, the New Museum, Kunsthalle Bern, The Studio Museum in Harlem, Index Stockholm, MOCA Los Angeles, and MCA Chicago. Syms teaches at the California Institute of the Arts.

Work 
Syms' work often explores contemporary Black identity, queer theory, and the power of language through video, performance, writing, and other media. She typically includes contemporary media such as found footage in her work to express these themes. Footage is important to Syms as she explains that 'video is a concise medium for transmitting a lot of information'. She describes herself as a 'hoarder of "orphaned media"'. For example, devices such as smartphones take the role of tools for constructing identity. Syms claims that although she does not use social media herself, she enjoys exploring its purpose in self-constructed identities. When creating her work, one approach often taken by Syms is to use spaces such as galleries to create a collage of multi-media. She also incorporates a range of technical skills such as coding, in which she is largely self taught, in addition to taking classes at the Armory Center for The Arts in Los Angeles. Syms also draws inspiration from satire, using parody and sarcasm to express messages in her art. She describes her working style as being led by the project and adapting her art throughout the creation process.

Publications 
Syms published Implications and Distinctions in 2011, an exploration of the performance of Black identity in contemporary cinema, as part of the Future Plan and Program project created by Steffani Jemison.

Syms published The Mundane Afrofuturist Manifesto through Rhizome in 2013. In her manifesto Syms calls for Black diasporic artistic producers to create culture that focuses on a more realistic future on earth. Syms writes:"The imaginative challenge that awaits any Mundane Afrofuturist author who accepts that this is it: Earth is all we have. What will we do with it? The chastening but hopefully enlivening effect of imagining a world without fantasy bolt-holes: no portals to the Egyptian kingdoms, no deep dives to Drexciya, no flying Africans to whisk us off to the Promised Land...The understanding that our "twoness" is inherently contemporary, even futuristic. DuBois asks how it feels to be a problem. Ol’ Dirty Bastard says "If I got a problem, a problem's got a problem 'til it’s gone."Syms released Most Days in 2014 which consisted of a table read of her screenplay about what an average day looks like for a young Black woman in 2050 Los Angeles. The score for the album was composed by Neal Reinalda.

Personal 
Syms is a fan of soccer and plays in Midfield for Sativa Football Club.

Collections, Lectures and Exhibitions

Public Collections 

 Art Institute of Chicago, Chicago IL, USA
 Carré d'Art, Musée d'art contemporain, Nîmes, France
 Guggenheim Museums and Foundation, New York NY, USA
 Hammer Museum, Los Angeles CA, USA
 JFABC Joan Flasch Artists' Book Collection, Chicago IL, USA
 Joan Flasch Artists’ Book Collection, Chicago IL, USA
 KADIST, Paris and San Francisco CA, USA
 LACMA Los Angeles County Museum of Art, Los Angeles CA, USA
 Leeds Art Gallery, Leeds, England
 MCA Museum of Contemporary Art Chicago, Chicago IL, USA
 MOCA Museum of Contemporary Art, Los Angeles CA, USA
 MoMA Museum of Modern Art, New York NY, USA
 Museum of Modern Art Library, New York  NY, USA
 Perez Art Museum, Miami FL, USA
 San Antonio Museum of Art, San Antonio TX, USA
 Serralves Foundation, Porto, Portugal
 Studio Museum in Harlem, New York NY, USA
 Walker Art Center, Minneapolis MN, USA
 Whitney Museum of American Art, New York NY, USA

Lectures and Conferences 

 William Greaves: Psychodrama, Interruption, and Circulation, Lewis Center for the Arts, Princeton University, Princeton NJ, co-organized with Fia Backström, 21 Feb, 2020
 with Colin Self, Sadie Coles HQ, London, 01 Oct, 2018
 March Meeting 2018: Active Forms, Sharjah Art Foundation, Shuwaihen, Sharjah, UAE, 17-19 Mar 2018
 Experience It: Martine Syms, A conversation with Martine Syms, Sharon Hayes and Jon Rafman, The Lab with California College of the Arts, San Francisco CA, USA, 26 Feb 2018
 Lounge Talk, Yebisu International Festival for Art and Alternative Visions, Tokyo Photographic Museum, Tokyo, Japan, 09 Feb 2018
 Martine Syms and Rizvana Bradley in conversation, Raven Row, London, England, 23 Apr 2017
 Friday Flights at the Getty, Getty Center, Los Angeles CA, USA, 26 Aug 2016
 Martine Syms, Todd Madigan Gallery & Department of Art at California State University, Bakersfield CA, USA, 16 Feb 2016
 Tip of Her Tongue: Martine Syms ‘Misdirected Kiss’, The Oculus Hall at The Broad, Los Angeles CA, USA, 21 Jan 2016
 A Pilot For A Show About Nowhere, PNCA Mediatheque, Portland OR, USA, 12 May 2015
 Seven on Seven, 7th Edition: Empathy & Disgust, Rhizome, New York NY, USA, 2 May 2015
 Lessons of the Tradition, California State University at Long Beach, Long Beach CA, USA, 2015
 Quality Television, Light Industry, New York NY, USA 28 Apr 2015
 Lessons of the Tradition, Pomona College, Claremont CA, USA, 2015
 Nite Life, O, Miami Poetry Festival, Miami FL, USA, 2015
 In the Archives, Contemporary Artists Books, Los Angeles CA, USA, 2015
 Lessons of the Tradition, Virginia Commonwealth University, Richmond VA, USA, 2014
 Black Radical Imagination II, REDCAT, Los Angeles CA, USA, 14 Nov 2014
 Black Vernacular: Lessons of the Tradition, London College of Communication, London, England, 17 Oct 2014
 Do You Follow? Art in Circulation, Rhizome/ICA Institute of Contemporary Art London, London, England, 15-17 Oct 2014
 Black Vernacular: Lessons of the Tradition, Oberlin College & Observatory, Oberlin OH, USA, 29 April 2014
 Most Days, Moogfest Biennial, Asheville NC, USA, 26 Apr 2014
 Black Vernacular, Insights 2014 Design Lecture Series, Walker Art Center, Minneapolis MN, USA, 18 Mar 2014
 Direct Design, Minneapolis College of Art and Design, Minneapolis MN, USA, 2014
 Most Days, Arts Incubator, University of Chicago, Chicago IL, USA, 2014
 Direct Design, Otis College of Art and Design, Los Angeles CA, USA, 2014
 Becoming Artists: Critique, Originality & Identity - Managing Biography: Negotiating Audience, Yale University, New Haven CT, USA, 08 Feb 2014
 New Paradigms in Digital Media ‘Mainstreaming’ a DIY Culture, Johns Hopkins University, Baltimore MD, USA, 13 Apr 2013
 Conceptual Entrepreneurism, Maryland Institute College of Art, Baltimore MD, USA, 2013
 Black Vernacular: Reading New Media, SXSW, Austin TX, USA, 2013
 Science Fiction & What It Feels Like To (Already) Live In the Future, Actual Size, Los Angeles CA, 11 Jan 2013
 Real Talk, California Institute of the Arts, Valencia CA, USA, 05 Nov 2012
 Reading Politics, Summer Forum, Chicago IL, USA, 2012
 The Didactic Possibilities of Film Titles, Houston Museum of African American Art, Houston TX, USA, 2011
 Artist/Authors, The Gregory School, Houston TX, USA, 2011
 Implications & Distinctions, Project Row Houses, Houston TX, USA, 2011
 Future Plan and Program - Lecture by Steffani Jemison and Martine Syms, Prairie View A & M University, Prairie View TX, USA, 19 Apr 2011

Solo exhibitions 
 Armory Center for the Arts (Pasadena, CA), Martine Syms, The Queen's English, 2014
 Locust Projects (Miami), Art on the Move: Nite Life, 2015
 White Flag Projects (Saint Louis, Missouri), Martine Syms, 2015
Machine Project (Los Angeles, CA), Notes on Gesture, 2015
 Bridget Donahue (New York), Martine Syms: Vertical Elevated Oblique, 2015
Audain Gallery (Vancouver, Canada), Borrowed Lady, 2016
 Human Resources (Los Angeles), Martine Syms: Black Box, 2016
 Karma International (Beverly Hills, California), Martine Syms: com port ment, 2016
 Institute of Contemporary Art (London, England), Martine Syms: Fact & Trouble, 2016
 Museum of Modern Art (New York), Projects 106: Martine Syms, 2017
Camden Arts Centre (London, England), VNXXCAS: Martine Syms, 2017
CONDO: Bridget Donahue hosted by Sadie Coles HQ (London, England), The Easy Demands, 2017
 Bridget Donahue (New York), Martine Syms: Big Surprise, 2018
Graham Foundation (Chicago IL), Incense Sweaters & Ice, 2018
Art Institute of Chicago (Chicago IL), SHE MAD: Laughing Gas, 2018
Sadie Coles HQ (London, England), Grand Calme, 2018
Serralves Foundation (Porto, Portugal), Contemporary Projects: Martine Syms, 2018
Secession (Vienna, Austria), Boon, 2019
Institute of Contemporary Art at Virginia Commonwealth University (Richmond VA), Shame Space, 2019
Sadie Coles HQ off-site: 24 Cork Street (London, England), Ugly Plymouths, 2020
SLAM | Saint Louis Art Museum (St. Louis MO), New Media Series, 2020
5239 Melrose Avenue (Los Angeles CA), New York, and Sadie Coles HQ (London, England), Ugly Plymouths, presented by Bridget Donahue, 2020
Bergen Kunsthall (Bergen, Norway), 2021

Group exhibitions 
 The Green Gallery (Milwaukee), YOU CAN DEPEND ON THE SUNSHINE: Paul Cowan, Marco Kane, Martine Syms, 2007
New Museum (New York), Museum as Hub: Alpha’s Bet Is Not Over Yet, 2011
 MCA Chicago, We Are Here: Art & Design Out of Context, 2011
The Green Gallery (Milwaukee), Three Card Monte, 2011 
Public Fiction (Los Angeles), Act II: The Props, 2012
 Institute of Contemporary Art (Philadelphia), First Among Equals, 2012 
Badlands Unlimited, Apple iTunes, How to Download a Boyfriend, 2012
Acid Rain TV (New York), The Didactic Possibilities of Film Titles, 2012
Young Art (Los Angeles), Mise-En-Scéne, 2012
Transfer Gallery (New York), gURLs, 2013
Aran Cravey (Los Angeles), Rhetoric, 2014
New Museum (New York), First Look: Martine Syms: Reading Trayvon Martin, 2014
356 Mission (Los Angeles), Another Cats Show, 2014
REDCAT (Los Angeles), Small New Films, 2014
Cooper Union (New York), Black Radical Imagination, 2014
 Studio Museum (Harlem, New York), Speaking of People: Ebony, Jet and Contemporary Art, 2014–2015
Project Row Houses (Houston, Texas), How We Work, 2015
Todd Madigan Gallery (California State University), Open House, 2015
ACTRE TV acretv.org, Tele-novela, 2015
Chan Gallery, Pomona College (Claremont), Candice Lin/Martine Syms, 2015
ICA Institute of Contemporary Art London (London, England), Artists’ Film Club: Avant-Noir, Volume 2, 2015
Bureau (New York), The Daily Show, 2015
Walker Art Center (Minneapolis), Intangibles, 2015
 New Museum (New York), 2015 Triennial: Surround Audience, 2015
The Coming Community, Artspace NZ (Auckland, New Zealand), Potentially Yours, 2016
Astrup Fearnley Museet (Oslo, Norway), Los Angeles - A Fiction, 2016
Galerie Conradi (Hamburg, Germany), Umwelt Inversion, 2016
Oakville Galleries (Oakville, Canada), Down To Write You This Poem Sat, 2016
Occidental Temporary (Paris, France), Cool Memories, 2016
International Center of Photography (New York), Public, Private, Secret, 2016
 Hammer Museum (Los Angeles), Made in L.A. 2016: a, the, though, only
Atlanta Contemporary (Atlanta), It Can Howl, 2016
HOME (Manchester, England), Imitation of Life: Melodrama and Race in the 21st Century, 2016
Whitechapel Gallery (London, England), Electronic Superhighway (2016-1966), 2016
Index Stockholm- The Swedish Contemporary Art Foundation (Stockholm, Sweden), Autobiography, 2016
Franklin Street Works (Stamford), Cut-Up: Contemporary Collage and Cut-Up Histories through a Feminist Lens, 2016
K11 Art Foundation pop-up space (Hong Kong), .COM/.CN, presented by K11 Art Foundation and Klaus Biesenbach and Peter Eleey, 2017
Museum of Art, Architecture and Technology (Lisbon, Portugal), Electronic Superhighway (2016-1966), 2017
ICA Institute of Contemporary Art Philadelphia (Philadelphia), Speech/Acts, 2017
Artspace (Sydney, Australia), The Public Body, 2017
The Mistake Room (Los Angeles), Analog Currency, 2017
Chateau Shatto (Los Angeles), At This Stage, 2017
Palazzo Contarini Polignac (Venice, Italy), Future Generation Art Prize @ Venice 2017, organised by the Victor Pinchuk Foundation, 2017
The Kitchen (New York), That I am reading backwards and into for a purpose, to go on:, 2017
Trinity Square Video (Toronto, Canada), What does one do with such a clairvoyant image?, 2017
Raven Row (London, England), 56 Artillery Lane, 2017
Galerie PCP (Paris, France), Our Words Return in Patterns (Part 1), 2017
Whitney Museum (New York), Whitney Biennal, as part of the John Riepenhoff installation, 2017
Musée d’art Contemporain de Lyon (Lyon, France), Los Angeles - A Fiction, 2017
Pinchuk Art Centre (Kyiv, Ukraine), Exhibition of 21 Artists Shortlisted for the Future Generation Art Prize 2017, 2017
Public Art Fund (New York), Commercial Break, 2017
Dazibao (Montreal, Canada), I Am the Organizer of My Own Archive, 2017
Team Gallery (New York), The Love Object (organized by Tom Brewer), 2017
University of Michigan Museum of Art (Ann Arbour MI), Art in the Age of the Internet, 1989 To Today, 2018
Madre museo d’arte contemporanea Donnaregina (Naples, Italy), Per_forming a collection. The Show Must Go_ON, 2018
FRONT International: Cleveland Triennial For Contemporary Art, Toby Devan Lewis Gallery, Museum of Contemporary Art Cleveland, An Evening of Queen White, 2018
Gwangju (South Korea), The 12th Gwangju Biennale Exhibition: Imagined Borders, 2018
Grunwald Gallery, School of Art, Architecture + Design (Bloomington IN), Out of Easy Reach, 2018
Kunstverein (Amsterdam, The Netherlands), Succession Sounds, 2018
Whitney Museum of American Art (New York), Eckhaus Latta: Possessed, 2018
Allen Memorial Art Museum (Oberlin OH), Radically Ordinary: Scenes form Black Life in America Since 1968, 2018
Art Basel (Basel, Switzerland), Unlimited, 2018
The Gallery, Michael’s (Santa Monica CA), 2018
Gallery 400 and DePaul Art Museum (Chicago IL), Out of Easy Reach, 2018
Kadist Foundation (Paris, France), This is Utopia, to Some, 2018
A Lone, installed adjacent to Capitol Hill Link rail station within city-wide project, Seattle WA, 2018
Gordon Robichaux (New York), A Page from My Intimate Journal (Part 1), 2018
Tokyo Photographic Art Museum (Tokyo, Japan), Yebisu International Festival for Art and Alternative Visions 2018, Mapping the Invisible, 2018
ICA Institute of Contemporary Art Boston (Boston MA), Art in the Age of the Internet, 1989 to Today, 2018
The Shed (New York), Manual Override, 2019
Yuz Museum (Shanghai, China), tongewölbe T25 (Ingolstadt, Germany), In Production: Art and the Studio System, 2019
Stony Island Arts Bank (Chicago IL), In the Absence of Light: Gesture, Humor and Resistance in The Black Aesthetic: Selections from the Beth Rudin DeWoody Collection, 2019
Yerba Buena Center for the Arts (San Francisco CA), The Body Electric, 2019
Luma Westbau, (Zürich Switzerland), It’s Urgent! – Part II, 2019
Gladstone Gallery (New York), Dry Land, 2019
Hammer Museum (Los Angeles), Celebration of Our Enemies: Selections from the Hammer Contemporary Collection, 2019
Los Angeles, The Foundation of the Museum: MOCA’s Collection, Museum of Contemporary Art, 2019
R & Company (New York), Chairs Beyond Right & Wrong, 2019
Whitney Museum of American Art (New York), Whitney Biennial 2019, 2019
Schinkel Pavillon (Berlin, Germany), Straying from the Line, 2019
FuturDome (Milan, Italy), Hypertimes, 2019
Lismore Castle Arts (Waterford, Ireland), Palimpsest, 2019
Walker Art Centre (Minneapolis MN), The Body Electric, 2019
ICA Institute of Contemporary Art at University of Pennsylvania (Philadelphia PA), Colored People Time: Mundane Futures, 2019
MDC MOAD Miami Dade College Museum of Art and Design (Miami FL), The Body Electric, 2020
The Luminary online (St. Louis MO), Self Maintenance Resource Center 2020, 2020
TOWER MMK, MMK Frankfurt, (Frankfurt am Main Germany), Sammlung, 2020
Gucci x Daelim Museum (Seoul, South Korea), No Space, Just a Place. Eterotopia, 2020
Auckland Art Gallery (Auckland, New Zealand), Honestly Speaking: The Word, the Body and the Internet, 2020
de Young Museum (San Francisco CA), Uncanny Valley: Being Human in the Age of AI, 2020
Princeton University (Princeton NJ), William Greaves, Sondra Perry, Martine Syms, organized by Martine Syms, 2020
MIT List Visual Arts Center (Cambridge MA), Colored People Time: Mundane Futures, Quotidian Pasts, Banal Presents, 2020
Mary Porter Sesnon Art Gallery, UC University California Santa Cruz (Santa Cruz CA), We Are Not Aliens: Arthur Jafa, Martine Syms, and Afro-Futurism 2.0, as part of Beyond the End of the World: Approaches in Contemporary Art Seminar, 2020

References

Further reading
 Hunt, Amanda. "Martine Syms." aperture: The Magazine of Photography and Ideas. Ed. Michael Famighetti. New York: Aperture Foundation, 2016. 132-137.
 
 St. Félix, Doreen. "How to Be a Successful Black Woman." The New Yorker, July 8, 2018. Retrieved August 11, 2020.

External links
Official website
Martine Syms | HOW TO SEE Projects 106 with Martine Syms, The Museum of Modern Art
Flashartonline.com
Archive.kchungradio.org
Vimeo.com
Dominica Publishing

1988 births
Living people
Artists from Los Angeles
School of the Art Institute of Chicago alumni
African-American contemporary artists
American contemporary artists
American women artists
21st-century African-American people
21st-century African-American women
20th-century African-American people
20th-century African-American women